The Polish war cemetery at Monte Cassino holds the graves of 1,072 Poles who died storming the bombed-out Benedictine abbey atop the mountain in May 1944, during the Battle of Monte Cassino. The cemetery is maintained by the Council for the Protection of Memorial Sites of Struggle and Martyrdom.

The religious affiliations of the deceased are indicated by three types of headstone: Christian crosses for Roman Catholic and Eastern Orthodox and Jewish headstones bearing the Star of David.

The cemetery also holds the grave of General Władysław Anders, who had commanded the Polish forces that captured Monte Cassino. Anders died in London in 1970 and his ashes were interred in the cemetery.

The cemetery itself can be clearly viewed from the Abbey, which lies just a few hundred meters away.

The cemetery is the closest of all allied cemeteries, symbolizing the importance of the Polish fighters during the battle. It was the Poles that are credited with liberating the abbey from Axis forces. As such, their war dead were honored with being buried in such close proximity to the structure for which they died liberating.

History
The cemetery is located on the slopes of what was designated as Point 445 and the abbey on the mountain of Monte Cassino. The majority of the soldiers buried here are from the Polish 2nd Army Corps of Lieutenant General Władysław Anders. Soldiers from this corps repeatedly attacked the German defenders inside the monastery at Monte Cassino during May 1944. On the morning of 18 May 1944, Polish forces finally entered the ruins of the abbey and hoisted the Polish flag.

The first interments in the cemetery occurred in 1944 and the cemetery was completed in 1946 based on designs by Wacław Hryniewicz and Jerzy Skolimowski. The official consecration of the site took place on September 1, 1945.

Inscriptions
The Polish memorial at Monte Cassino bears two inscriptions. The first, based on the Epitaph of Simonides, reads:
Passer-by, go tell Poland
That we have perished obedient to her service

The other on a gatepost near the entrance translates from Polish:
For our freedom and yours
We soldiers of Poland gave
Our soul to God
Our life to the soil of Italy
Our hearts to Poland

An anthem, "The Red Poppies on Monte Cassino" — composed on the eve of the Polish storming of the German stronghold — memorializes the Polish soldiers who gave their lives. The refrain is familiar to most Poles:
The red poppies on Monte Cassino
Drank Polish blood instead of dew...
O'er the poppies the soldiers did go
'Mid death, and to their anger stayed true!
Years will come and ages will go,
Enshrining their strivings and their toil!...
And the poppies on Monte Cassino
Will be redder for Poles' blood in their soil.

Gallery

See also
 Polish Cemetery in Bandar-e Anzali
 Polish Military Cemetery at Casamassima
 Lieutenant General Władysław Albert Anders (1892–1970)

References

External links
 Polish World War II Military Cemeteries in Italy
 Traces of War
 The War Cemeteries at Cassino (from Internet Archive Wayback Machine)

Battle of Monte Cassino
Polish military memorials and cemeteries
World War II cemeteries in Italy
Italy–Poland relations